
Vilsandi National Park is a marine protected area in Saare County, Estonia.  It includes part of the island of Vilsandi, a number of smaller islands, adjacent parts of western Saaremaa and the Harilaid peninsula on Saaremaa, all in Kihelkonna Parish and Lääne-Saare Parish.

History 
The park grew from a bird reserve founded in 1910.  It is a highly sensitive ecosystem due to the use of the area as stop-over by many migratory birds, like barnacle geese and Steller's eider, and as a breeding and nesting ground for over 247 species of birds, of which the most common is the eider duck. One third of all protected plant species in Estonia can also be found in the national park. Hunting is absolutely prohibited.  This park is a popular tourist destination for both Estonians and foreign visitors, particularly from Finland.

See also
 Protected areas of Estonia
 List of national parks in the Baltics
 List of protected areas of Estonia
 List of Ramsar sites in Estonia

External links

Vilsandi National Park (in Estonian)
Vilsandi National Park at the Estonian State Forest Management Centre (RMK)

References

National parks of Estonia
Protected areas established in 1957
1957 establishments in Estonia
Saaremaa Parish
Ramsar sites in Estonia
Geography of Saare County
Tourist attractions in Saare County